Steven Crouch (born 24 December 1977) is a former professional rugby league footballer who played for the Parramatta Eels, Manly-Warringah Sea Eagles, Wests Tigers, Sydney Roosters and the Castleford Tigers (Heritage № 819).

References

1977 births
Living people
Australian rugby league players
Castleford Tigers players
Manly Warringah Sea Eagles players
Parramatta Eels players
Rugby league players from Sydney
Rugby league second-rows
Sydney Roosters players
Wests Tigers players